John Joseph Gibbons (December 8, 1924 – December 9, 2018) was a United States circuit judge of the United States Court of Appeals for the Third Circuit and later a partner at the law firm of Gibbons P.C. After service ub the US Navy he began his legal career at Crummy & Consodine and later became a partner of the firm, which incorporated his name into its title. He was nominated to the Third Circuit by President Richard Nixon in December 1969 and served on that court until his retirement in 1990. During the last three years he served as chief judge and during his tenure wrote more than 800 legal opinions. After retirement Gibbons returned to his original firm and worked on human rights cases, in commercial arbitration and intellectual property disputes. He received  a lifetime achievement award from The American Lawyer in 2005 and in 2006 was named as one of the National Law Journals  "100 most influential lawyers".

Education and career
Born in Newark, New Jersey, Gibbons was raised in Belleville, New Jersey. He graduated from Saint Benedict's Preparatory School in 1942. He served in the United States Navy from 1943 to 1946. Gibbons graduated from the College of the Holy Cross in 1947 with a Bachelor of Science degree and from Harvard Law School in 1950 with a Bachelor of Laws. After graduation, Gibbons joined the firm of Crummy & Consodine. After several years with the firm, he was named a partner and the firm's name changed to Crummy, Consodine & Gibbons. In 1967, Gibbons became President of the New Jersey State Bar Association, and also a member of the Governor's Commission on Civil Disorders.  This was during the time of the Newark riots which left 23 people dead and more than 1,500 arrested.  The firm responded by sending cars full of lawyers to courthouses to speed up the processing of bail applications and reduce jail overcrowding.  The firm represented many of those charged on a pro bono basis.

Federal judicial service
Gibbons was nominated to the United States Court of Appeals for the Third Circuit by President Richard Nixon on December 5, 1969, to a seat vacated by Judge Gerald McLaughlin. Gibbons was confirmed by the Senate on December 17, 1969, and received his commission on December 18, 1969. He served as Chief Judge of the Third Circuit between 1987 and 1990 and retired on January 15, 1990.

Post-judicial career
Gibbons returned to the firm bearing his name in 1990 (which was then renamed Gibbons, Del Deo, Dolan, Griffinger & Vecchione), and founded the John J. Gibbons Fellowship in Public Interest & Constitutional Law. He also taught constitutional law at Seton Hall University School of Law until 1997. Gibbons was involved in defending 660 of the detainees at the Guantanamo Bay detention camp.  He successfully opposed their detention without judicial review.

He also worked as a mediator and arbitrator in commercial disputes between large corporations and in litigation in the fields of antitrust, intellectual property law and securities regulation.  He was a member of the American Bar Association's house of delegates and was chairman of its Committee on Fair Trial and Free Press.

Gibbons was named "lawyer of the year" by the New Jersey Law Journal in 2004 and received a lifetime achievement award from The American Lawyer in 2005.  In 2006 he was named on the National Law Journal's list of "100 most influential lawyers".  Gibbons was appointed a life member of the American Law Institute and was also a fellow of the American Bar Foundation.  He was a director of the American Arbitration Association and trustee emeritus of both the Practicing Law Institute and Holy Cross College and a trustee of the Fund for New Jersey.  Gibbons died on December 9, 2018, the day after his 94th birthday.

References

External links
 
 Gibbons' attorney bio from Gibbons P.C.

1924 births
2018 deaths
College of the Holy Cross alumni
Harvard Law School alumni
Judges of the United States Court of Appeals for the Third Circuit
Lawyers from Newark, New Jersey
Military personnel from Newark, New Jersey
People from Belleville, New Jersey
Seton Hall University School of Law faculty
St. Benedict's Preparatory School alumni
United States court of appeals judges appointed by Richard Nixon
20th-century American judges
United States Navy personnel of World War II